The Gatún River is a river of Panama. It is the main feeder of the summit section (Gatun Lake).

See also
List of rivers of Panama

References

 Rand McNally, The New International Atlas, 1993.
CIA map, 1995.

Rivers of Panama